Hospital Records is a British independent record label based in South London. Primarily releasing drum and bass, the label was started in 1996 by Tony Colman (London Elektricity) and Chris Goss, and has grown in recent years to become one of the most well-known labels within UK dance music. The label has been home to artists such as Blame, Danny Byrd, Camo & Krooked, Logistics, Nu:Tone, Metrik, Fred V & Grafix, High Contrast and S.P.Y but also releases tracks from across the DnB genre. In Forest Hill, South London, Hospital runs the publishing company Songs in the Key of Knife and their worldwide events brand Hospitality. Until the end of 2019, they also ran the more experimental label Med School Music.

From 2009 to 2011 and 2014 to 2020, Hospital Records has won the Best Label title at the Drum & Bass Arena Awards. The label is also known for its frequent appearances in Playground Games' Forza Horizon series since Forza Horizon 2 as an in-game radio station, with Goss and Colman acting as DJs in the second, third, and fourth games in the series, while musician Degs replaces Colman as Goss's co-DJ in Forza Horizon 5.

Current roster
The following musicians are signed to Hospital Records.
 Bop (also duo with Subwave)
 Camo & Krooked
 Danny Byrd
 Degs
 DRS & Dynamite
 Etherwood
 Flava D
 Fred V & Grafix (as solo artists since 2019)
 High Contrast
 Hugh Hardie
 Inja
 Keeno
 Kings of the Rollers
 Lens
 Logistics
 London Elektricity
 Makoto
 Metrik
 Mitekiss
 Netsky
 Nu:Logic (Nu:Tone & Logistics)
 Nu:Tone
 S.P.Y
 SOLAH
 Unglued
 Urbandawn
 Voltage (one third of Kings of the Rollers)
 Whiney (also duo with P Money)
 Winslow

Hospitality

'Hospitality' is Hospital Record's event brand. Drum and bass events involving a set of artists from the label are often advertised as 'Hospitality' events, with events such as 'Hospitality Brixton'.

In 2014 Hospital Records celebrated its 18th birthday by revisiting some of the venues it had used for past Hospitality events. The first event took place at 02 complex in Greenwich, London. This was formerly the Matter nightclub. On 4 May Hospitality visited Heaven near Charing Cross station in central London .

In 2017, the label turned 21, a milestone marked by the release of a 'best of' compilation album featuring a selection of tracks produced by the label during its lifetime. Named 'We are 21', the album was released as a precursor to a year of planned events celebrating the breadth and variety of the entire drum and bass spectrum. These include the follow-up to 2016's award-winning Hospitality in the Park festival in London's Finsbury Park, where a sold-out crowd of over 10,000 watched more than 100 artists performing across 5 stages in a single day. The festival marked a step into unknown territory for the label, is by far the largest Hospitality event ever planned.
The day was later described by label boss Tony Colman (Aka London Elektricity) on his weekly podcast as, "One of the best days of my life."

Hospitality in the Park 2017 set out to be even more ambitious.
2,500 extra tickets were made available, taking the crowd capacity up to 12,500. Despite this, the event sold out once more. With many more performers than at even the record-breaking 2016 event – this time appearing in one of eight different arenas – the festival further broadened its already eclectic focus. Hospitality in the Park has returned for the following 2 years.

Other big events for the label included the sold-out Hospitality in the Dock, which took place in April 2017 in London's sprawling Grade 1 listed tobacco dock. This was the biggest indoor event ever held by Hospital Records, again showcasing a wide variety of acts across a number of stages. Hospitality in the Dock built on the success of Hospitality in the Park 2016 and further underlined the importance of the label to both the industry and the genre. The unprecedented size, scale, and success of these events have cemented the reputation of Hospital Records as one of the leading players in the industry.

In 2018, another main event, Hospitality on the Beach, took place at The Garden Resort in Tisno, Croatia. The event was a 5-day beach festival that included boat parties, beach-side stages as well as sets featuring artists from the Hospital and Med School labels, along with many other artists from other labels such as Critical Music and Spearhead Records. The event has returned for 2019 and will also return for 2020.

Hospital Records provides a number of compilation albums throughout the year named 'Hospitality'. The albums contain tracks, VIP mixes, and remixes from both artists of the label as well as artists outside the label, such as Genetic Bros, Cyantific, Sub Zero, and TC. All of the albums contain about 30 tracks, as well as a mix (mixed by recognised DJs such as London Elektricity, Stanza, and Tomahawk) containing all of the tracks in the album.

Subsidiaries

Soulvent Records
In May 2020, Hospital Records first showed interest to support Drum-and-bass label Soulvent Records. In June 2022, it was announced that the label will join Hospital as an imprint.

Songs in the Key of Knife
Working in partnership with long-established music publishers Fairwood Music Ltd, Nichion Inc and Westbury Music Ltd, Songs in the Key Of Knife makes every effort to develop the careers of both established and emerging writers whilst maximising the potential of their works.

Clinic Talent
In 2015 Hospital created its in-house booking agency, Clinic Talent. Clinic Talent manages bookings for a range of DJs, MCs, and live acts, some signed to Hospital and some from other labels. Acts include Hospital CEO London Elektricity. Clinic Talent is managed by Blu Mar Ten.

MedSchool
In 2006, an imprint particularly designed for newcomers was set up, some of which were S.P.Y., Keeno and Etherwood. The label ceased operations in 2019.

Podcast
Tony Colman was the original host of the Hospital Records Podcast. He was occasionally joined by a guest from the label or an up-and-coming unsigned artist. Colman often played demos from budding producers on the podcast.

Starting in April 2022, the Hospital-signed DJ Degs took over as the main host of the podcast.

The podcast has won the BT Digital Music Award for Best Podcast in 2006, 2007 and 2008.

References

Further reading

External links

 Med School official website
 Hospital Records' SoundCloud

English record labels
Electronic music record labels
English electronic dance music record labels
Drum and bass record labels
Record labels established in 1996
IFPI members